Robert Parlane (5 January 1847 – 13 January 1918) was a Scottish footballer who played as a goalkeeper.

Career
Born in the Vale of Leven in Dunbartonshire, Parlane played club football for Vale of Leven, and made three appearances for Scotland. He won the Scottish Cup three times in a row with Vale of Leven (1877–1879).

Parlane was also a cricketer for the Vale of Leven Cricket Club.

References

1847 births
1918 deaths
Scottish footballers
Scotland international footballers
Vale of Leven F.C. players
Association football goalkeepers
People from Bonhill
Footballers from West Dunbartonshire